Crotalus angelensis, or the Ángel de la Guarda Island speckled rattlesnake, is a pitviper species endemic to Isla Ángel de la Guarda in the Gulf of California, Mexico. Like all other pitvipers, it is venomous. It is sometimes treated as a subspecies of Crotalus mitchellii.

Description

Geographic range
Found only on Isla Ángel de la Guarda in the Gulf of California, Mexico.

Habitat
Gravelly beaches along the shore; rocky arroyos, washes, and on the hillsides of the island's interior, from sea-level up to 500 m.

Conservation status
This species is classified as "Least Concern" (LC) on the IUCN Red List of Threatened Species. It occurs in a protected area and is very abundant within its small range.

References

Further reading
 Klauber, L.M. 1963. A new insular subspecies of the speckled rattlesnake. Trans. San Diego Soc. Nat. Hist. 13: 73-80.

angelensis
Endemic reptiles of Mexico
Endemic fauna of the Baja California Peninsula
Fauna of Gulf of California islands
Least concern biota of North America
Taxa named by Laurence Monroe Klauber